Rubus wahlbergii is a species of flowering plant belonging to the family Rosaceae.

It is native to Europe.

References

wahlbergii